Joseph William Beaudry (March 27, 1885 – March 22, 1954) was a provincial politician from Alberta, Canada. He served as a member of the Legislative Assembly of Alberta from 1935 to 1952, sitting with the Social Credit caucus in government.

References

Alberta Social Credit Party MLAs
1954 deaths
1885 births